Li Yuan (born 20 October 1989) is a Chinese former professional snooker player.

Career
Li had previously appeared as a wildcard at several ranking tournaments, such as the 2008 China Open where he pushed Marco Fu to a deciding frame, narrowly losing 5–4. The following season he appeared at the 2008 Shanghai Masters where he lost 5–1 to Andy Hicks. He then played in several Asian Tour Events, reaching the last 16 on two occasions, before appearing at the 2017 China Open wildcard round where he was defeated by 5-1 by Jimmy White.

Li turned professional in 2017, after being nominated as one of the two players from the CBSA China Snooker Tour.

Performance and rankings timeline

Notes

Career finals

Amateur finals: 1

References

External links

Li Yuan at worldsnooker.com
Li Yuan at CueTracker.net: Snooker Results and Statistic Database
Profile on Snooker.org

1989 births
Place of birth unknown
Living people
Chinese snooker players
21st-century Chinese people